Bakerella is a genus of North American planthoppers in the family Delphacidae. Species include:

Bakerella angulata 
Bakerella bidens 
Bakerella bullata 
Bakerella cinerea 
Bakerella cornigera 
Bakerella fusca 
Bakerella maculata  – type species
Bakerella minuta 
Bakerella muscotana 
Bakerella pediforma 
Bakerella penefusca 
Bakerella rotundifrons 
Bakerella spinifera

References

Delphacini
Auchenorrhyncha genera